Aya Saeid Saber (born 20 March 1991), also known as "Sheklesa",  is a mixed martial artist, who is the first woman from Egypt to compete professionally in the sport.

Biography 
Saber was born on 20 March 1991. Her interest in martial arts began as a child when she earned a brown belt in karate in 2000. From there she joined the Egyptian National Kung Fu team, winning competitions with them. She then met Mohamed Abdel Hameed, a coach who introduced MMA to Egypt and established the Top Team - Egypt's MMA squad. Saber is the only woman in the team and is also the first woman from Egypt to compete in the sport. She coaches a new generation of women to become mixed martial artists; ultimately she intends to establish Egypt's first all-female MMA team. She recognises that in Egypt, where in 2013 over 99% of women had experienced sexual harassment, it is important for women to develop the skills in order to physically defend themselves from men.

Mixed martial arts career

Egyptian Fighting Championship 
Saber made her professional MMA debut on 7 October 2012 in the Egyptian Fighting Championship (EFC), defeating Fatma Mansour. After appearing in two Superfight League matches, she returned to the EFC, losing against Yousra Ahmed on 3 May 2013. In March 2014 she beat Aya Rashdan in the EFC.

Super Fight League 
In 2012 she next fought Colleen Schneider at SFL 6, which Schneider won after stopping Saber from elbow strikes in the first round. Saber's next match was against Ritika Singh at SF 11, which Singh won.

One Championship 
Saber fought Ana Julaton on 2 May 2014, where the boxer made her ONE Fighting Championship: Rise of Heroes debut. Julaton's fight debut was successful and she won the fight via TKO in the third round, despite commentators in advance expecting Saber to take the fight. On 17 October 2014 she took on Malaysian Muslim fighter Ann Osman at Stadium Putra, watched by 10,000 fans. Osman beat Saber in the first round.

In 2015, she returned to the One Championship and was defeated by Angela Lee in Round 1. This match was Lee's professional debut, although she had previously fought as an amateur and was well known in her home of Hawai'i.

Evolution Championship 
On 27 March 2015, Saber beat Fathia Mostafa in the Evolution Championship with a TKO (punches).

Kunlun Fight 
Saber's final fight in 2015 was against Jin Tang in the Kunlun Fight League, where Tang beat her in Round 1.

Glory of Heroes 
In 2018 saber fought in the Glory of Heroes promotion, where she was defeated by Meng Bo.

Mixed martial arts record 

|-
| Loss
| align=center| 
| Meng Bo
| Submission (armbar)
| Glory of Heroes 35 - Meishan
| 
| align=center| 
| align=center| 
| Sichuan, China
| 
|-
| Loss
| align=center| 
| Jin Tang
| Submission (armbar)
| Kunlun Fight 34 - World Tour
| 
| align=center| 
| align=center| 
| Shenzhen Bay Gymnasium, Shenzhen, China
| 
|-
| Loss
| align=center| 
| Angela Lee
| Submission (armbar)
| One Championship 27 Warrior's Quest
| 
| align=center| 
| align=center| 
| Singapore
| 
|-
| Win
| align=center| 
| Fathia Mostafa
| TKO (Punches)
| Evolution Championship - War Against Terrorism
| 
| align=center| 
| align=center| 
| Naser City Sports Club, Cairo
| 
|-
| Loss
| align=center| 
| Ann Osman
| TKO (Elbows)
| One FC 21 - Roar of Tigers
| 
| align=center| 
| align=center| 
| Putra Indoor Stadium, Kuala Lumpur, MALAYSIA
|
|-
| Loss
| align=center| 
| Ana Julaton
| TKO (Punches)
| ONE Fighting Championship: Rise of Heroes
| 
| align=center|
| align=center| 
| Manila, Philippines
|
|-
| Win
| align=center| 
| Aya Rashdan
| Submission (Rear-Naked Choke)
| EFC - Egyptian Fighting Championship 14
| 
| align=center| 
| align=center| 
| Cairo University, Cairo, Egypt
|
|-
| Loss
| align=center| 
| Yousra Ahmed
| Submission (Guillotine Choke)
| EFC - Egyptian Fighting Championship 10
| 
| align=center| 
| align=center| 
| Cairo University, Cairo, Egypt
| 
|-
| Loss
| align=center| 
| Ritika Singh
| Decision (unanimous)
| SFL 11 - Super Fight League 11
| 
| align=center| 
| align=center| 
| Mumbai, Mahararastra
| 
|-
| Loss
| align=center| 
| Colleen Schneider
| TKO (Elbows)
| SFL 6 - Super Fight League 6
| 
| align=center| 
| align=center| 
| Mumbai, Mahararastra
| 
|-
| Win
| align=center| 
| Fatma Mansour
| Decision (Unanimous)
| EFC - Egyptian Fighting Championship 8
| 
| align=center| 
| align=center| 
| Egyptian Media Production City, Cairo, Egypt
| 
|-

Personal life 
Saber is married and has a daughter.

References

External links 
 Egypt: The story of the country’s first female MMA fighter

1991 births
Living people
Sportspeople from Cairo
Egyptian female kickboxers
Egyptian wushu practitioners
Egyptian female karateka
Egyptian female mixed martial artists
Mixed martial artists utilizing wushu
Mixed martial artists utilizing karate